The 1972 Arkansas Razorbacks football team represented the University of Arkansas in the Southwest Conference (SWC) during the 1972 NCAA University Division football season. In their 15th year under head coach Frank Broyles, the Razorbacks compiled a 6–5 record (3–4 against SWC opponents), finished in a tie for fourth place in the SWC, and outscored all opponents by a combined total of 228 to 227.

Schedule

Roster
QB Joe Ferguson, Sr.
Tom Reed, OL Sr., Team Captain

References

Arkansas
Arkansas Razorbacks football seasons
Arkansas Razorbacks football